Czarniecki (feminine form: Czarniecka, plural: Czarnieccy) was a Polish noble family.

History

The Czarniecki family was most prominent in the 17th century and can be traced back to the 14th century. The Łodzia coat of arms was given to the family by King Władysław II Jagiełło. The family name originates from the town of Czarnca in the Świętokrzyskie Voivodeship, Włoszczowa County.

Notable members
Among most known members are:

 Krzysztof Czarniecki z Czarncy  (1564–1636), courtier, starost of Chęciny and Żywiec, married Krystyna Rzeszowska h. Wąż z jabłkiem and Jadwiga Brzostowska z Żeronic h. Strzemię
 Stefan Czarniecki z Czarncy (1599–1665), Field Hetman of the Crown, voivode of Kiev and Ruthenia, married Zofia Kobierzycka z Kobierzycka Wielkiego i Małego h. Pomian
 Paweł Czarniecki z Czarncy (died 1664), rotmistrz and Royal pułkownik
 Jan Aleksander Czarniecki z Czarncy, miecznik of Kraków  
 Jan Czarniecki z Czarncy, Bishop of Kamieniec Podolski and prior of Czerwinsk

Coat of arms and motto
The Czarniecki family used the Łodzia coat of arms.

See also
 National Anthem of Poland

Bibliography
 Podhorodecki L., Sławni hetmani Rzeczypospolitej, Warszawa 1994, s. 409.
 Czarnieccy z Czarncy w służbie królów i Rzeczypospolitej. Author, Teofila Sokolińska. Publisher, Oficyna Wydawnicza "Ston 2", 2003. ISBN, 8372730822

References

Polish noble families